This is a list of songs recorded by Indian female playback singer Shilpa Rao.

Hindi film songs

2005

2007

2008

2009

2010

2011

2012

2013

2014

2015

2016

2017

2018

2019

2020

2021

2022

Hindi Non-Film songs

Regional songs 
Bengali

Telugu

Tamil

Malayalam

References

External links
 
 Shilpa Rao at Bollywood Hungama

Rao, Shilpa